Peter Denoyelles was a Representative from New York; born in Haverstraw, New York, in 1766; completed preparatory studies; engaged in the manufacture of brick; member of the New York State Assembly in 1802 and 1803; held several local offices; elected as a Democratic-Republican to the Thirteenth Congress (March 4, 1813 – March 3, 1815); resumed his former manufacturing pursuits; died in Haverstraw, May 6, 1829; interment in Mount Repose Cemetery.

From May 1813 to Mar 1815, Denoyelles missed 101 of 352 roll call votes, which is 28.7%. This is worse than the median of 18.4% among the lifetime records of representatives serving in Mar 1815.

Sources

Notes

1766 births
1829 deaths
Members of the New York State Assembly
People from Haverstraw, New York
Democratic-Republican Party members of the United States House of Representatives from New York (state)